Projapoti (প্রজাপতি) may refer to:

 Projapoti (cricket), a type of delivery executed typically by medium pace and fast bowlers
 Projapoti: The Mysterious Bird, a 2011 Bangladeshi film
 Projapoti (2022 film), an Indian Bengali-language family drama 
 Painted bat, also known as "butterfly bat" (Projapoti Badur) 
 Projapoti Biskut, 2017 Bengali film directed by Anindya Chatterjee
 Shantilal O Projapoti Rohoshyo, 2019 Indian Bengali mystery-thriller film

See also
 Prajapati (disambiguation)